Smithgall Woods Conservation Area and Lodge is a  Georgia state park, lodge and protected wilderness area near Helen, Georgia. It contains old growth forests, 12 miles of trout streams, and populations of wild turkeys, bears and deer.

The area is named for Charles A. Smithgall Jr., a Georgia publisher, broadcaster and philanthropist who sold the property to the state in 1994 for half its appraised value. He had assembled the acreage in the 1970s and had a team clear trash, restock streams and plant thousands of trees. In a 1988 interview Smithgall was quoted, "At some point, a man has to put something back. I hate to see people just take from the land and never put something back."

Facilities

Picnic Shelters
Campground - for youth groups only
Hiking Trails
Visitor Center
The Lodge at Smithgall Woods

References

External links

   Smithgall Woods Conservation Area and Lodge

State parks of Georgia (U.S. state)
Protected areas of White County, Georgia